Armani Bolaghi (also Romanized as Armanī Bolāghī; also known as Kānī Gol, Arman Bolāghī, and Armanī Bulāgh) is a village in Akhtachi-ye Mahali Rural District, Simmineh District, Bukan County, West Azerbaijan Province, Iran. At the 2006 census, its population was 388, in 70 families.

Notable people 

 Edeb

References 

Populated places in Bukan County